Thesium humile is a species of annual herb in the family Santalaceae. They have a self-supporting growth form and simple, broad leaves. Individuals can grow to 0.2 m.

Sources

References 

Flora of Malta
Santalaceae